Raggi is a surname and may refer to:

Andrea Raggi (born 1984), Italian footballer
Antonio Raggi (1624–1686), Italian sculptor
Camilla Salvago Raggi (born 1924), Italian poet and novelist
Giuseppe Salvago Raggi (1866-1946), Italian diplomat  
Gonippo Raggi (1875–1959), Italian artists
Jorge Humberto Raggi (born 1938), retired Portuguese footballer
Lorenzo Raggi (1615–1687), Italian Catholic Cardinal
Maria Raggi (1552–1600), Catholic nun of Genoese descent from island of Chios
Mario Raggi (1821–1907), Italian sculptor
Ottaviano Raggi (1592–1643), Italian Catholic Cardinal
Pietro Paolo Raggi (1646–1724), Italian painter
Reena Raggi (born 1951), US federal judge
Virginia Raggi (born 1978), mayor of Rome

See also
Raggio
Memorial to Maria Raggi
Raggi Bjarna (born 1934), Icelandic singer